Hancock Custis was a member of the Virginia House of Burgesses, the elected lower house of the colonial Virginia General Assembly from Accomack County, Virginia in 1710–1712.

Family 
Hancock Custis was one of the younger sons of Colonel John Custis III and Margaret (Michael) Custis. His elder brother John Custis IV also served in the House of Burgesses and the Virginia Governor's Council.

Hancock Custis's brother, Major John Custis, was the father of Daniel Parke Custis, first husband of Martha Washington. Major John Custis named one of his sons "Hancock."

Hancock Custis's will, which was proved May 7, 1728, mentions his wife Mary. Hancock and Mary Custis's children were sons John, Southey, Levin and Theophilus and daughter Leah, who married Levin Gale.

Farm
Hancock Custis inherited a farm at King's Creek from his uncle, Adam Michael.

House of Burgesses
Accomac County voters elected Hancock Custis as one of their representatives in the Virginia House of Burgesses in 1710, but he did not win another term.

Death
Hancock Custis died between the date of his signing the last codicil to his will, August 17, 1727, and a date before his will was proved on May 7, 1728.

Notes

References
 Harrison, William Welsh. 'Harrison, Waples and allied families: being the Ancestry of George Leib Harrison of Philadelphia and of his wife Sarah Ann Waples'. Philadelphia: Private printing by Edward Steen & Co., Inc., 1910. . Retrieved March 1, 2013.
 Nottingham, Stratton. 'Wills and Administrations: Accomack County, Virginia, 1663-1800'. Baltimore: Genealogical Publishing Co., 1999. Originally published 1931. . Retrieved March 1, 2013.
 Tyler, Lyon Gardiner, ed. 'Encyclopedia of Virginia Biography'. Volume 1. New York, Lewis Historical Publishing Company, 1915. . Retrieved February 16, 2013.
 Wise, Jennings Cropper. 'Col. John Wise of England and Virginia (1617-1695); his ancestors and descendants'. Richmond, VA: Bell Books and Stationery Co., 1918. . Retrieved March 2, 2013.

People from Accomack County, Virginia
House of Burgesses members
Custis family of Virginia

1720s deaths
Year of birth missing
Year of death uncertain